Johannes Schweter (born 28 August 1901 in Schomberg, Germany) was a German NSDAP politician.

From 1933 to 1935 Schweter was the Kreisleiter (County Leader) of the Beuthen (Polish: Bytom) District and from 1939 the Kreisleiter of Kreuzburg (Polish: Kluczbork).

References

Literature 
 :de:Joachim Lilla, Martin Döring, Andreas Schulz: Statisten in Uniform. Die Mitglieder des Reichstags 1933–1945. Ein biographisches Handbuch. Unter Einbeziehung der völkischen und nationalsozialistischen Reichstagsabgeordneten ab Mai 1924. Droste, Düsseldorf 2004, .
 :de:Erich Stockhorst: 5000 Köpfe. Wer war was im 3. Reich. 2. Auflage. Arndt, Kiel 2000, .

External links
 Johannes Schweter in the "Datenbank der Reichstagsabgeordneten"

Nazis
1901 births
Year of death missing